Plumbago wissii is a species of plant in the family Plumbaginaceae endemic to Namibia.  Its natural habitat is rocky areas.

References

wissii
Endemic flora of Namibia
Least concern plants
Taxonomy articles created by Polbot